Atomkraft? Nein, Danke! is the third full-length album by the American electronic band Earthstar. It was their second release for the Hamburg, Germany-based Sky Records on February 1, 1981. Atomkraft? Nein, Danke! was recorded during 1979 and 1980 at Deponté la Rue Studio in Paris, France, and IC Studios and Emch Studio in West Germany. Additional tracks were recorded at Aura Sound Studio in New York. All tracks were written by Craig Wuest except "Golden Rendezvous", which was written by Wuest and Daniel Zongrone, and "Forest Floor, Part II: Aras", a tape-loop improvisation with guitarist Dennis Rea.

The title, Atomkraft? Nein, Danke! has been the slogan of the German anti-nuclear movement since the 70s and literally means "Nuclear power? No, thanks!", a possible reference to the Smiling Sun logo associated with this phrase. Craig Wuest's intention in recording this album was to create an environmental tone poem, and some tracks, particularly "Sonntagsspaziergang", have an almost symphonic sound. The Planet Mellotron Web site describes the album as "more laid back" than its predecessor French Skyline and "...an ideal opportunity to hear the rarest tape-replay instrument", the Birotron.

The track White Cloud was included on the Sky Records collection Schwingungen - New Age Music, released in 1985. This represented the first time any Earthstar track appeared on CD. Atomkraft? Nein, Danke! is still available on LP from Sky Records but has never been reissued on CD in its entirety.

Track listing
 "Golden Rendezvous" – 7:25
 "Sonntagsspaziergang" (Sunday stroll) - 5:04
 "Garden's End" - 3:00
 "Wind Mills" - 5:30
 "Cafe Sequence" - 2:05
 "Cafe Exit (incl. March of the Flanged Angels)" - 5:40
 "White Cloud" - 4:15
 "Solar Mirrors" - 3:37
 "Jet Sets" - 5:00("Atomic Fallouts", "Flash to Ash")
 "Forest Floor" - 7:20a. "Part I: Atomkraft? Nein, Danke!"b. "Part II: Aras"

Personnel
 Craig Wuest – Minimoog, Polymoog, Korg synthesizer, String Ensemble, Elka Rhapsody, Birotron B90, "Night Machine", percussion, producer, engineer
 Daniel Zongrone – piano, bells, vibraphone
 Dennis Rea – electric guitar
 Louis Deponté – "Night Machine", tape loops, assistant engineer
 Daryl Trivieri – electric violin
 Martin Burdette Martinez – electric guitar on "Garden's End"
 Rainer Böhm – violin
 Christoph Lagemann – cello
 Melanie Coiro – bells, Percussion
 John Bunkfeldt – harmonizer, engineer
 Gert Anders – engineer

References

General sources
 Album liner notes
 Prog Archives . Retrieved August 20, 2007.
 Mutant Sounds . Retrieved August 20, 2007
 Amazon.de . Retrieved August 30, 2007

1981 albums
Earthstar (band) albums